Lower Chehalis (Łəw̓ál̕məš) is a member of the Tsamosan (or Olympic Peninsula) branch of the Coast Salish family of Salishan languages. In some classifications, Lower Chehalis is placed closer to Quinault than it is to Upper Chehalis.

Phonology

Allophones are also noted.

References

Coast Salish languages